Clayton is a suburb in Melbourne, Victoria, Australia, 18 km south-east of Melbourne's Central Business District, located within the City of Monash local government area. Clayton recorded a population of 18,988 at the 2021 census.

Overview

The main focus for the suburb of Clayton is the shopping strip that runs along Clayton Road. The local railway station, situated at the northern end of the shopping strip bears the name Clayton railway station.

Demographics

In the 2016 Census, there were 19,358 people in Clayton.  24.7% of people were born in Australia and 25.7% of people were born in China. The next most common countries of birth were India 10.0%, Malaysia 3.9%, Indonesia 3.0% and Sri Lanka 2.7%. 25.2% of people spoke only English at home. Other languages spoken at home included Mandarin 26.9%, Greek 4.7%, Cantonese 4.2%, Indonesian 2.8% and Hindi 2.6%. The most common responses for religion in Clayton were No Religion 39.4% and Catholic 13.9%. The median age for Clayton was 25 which is 13 years younger the Australian average.

History

The area was first occupied for farming in the 1850s and was originally named after a property, "Clayton Vale", owned by lawyer John Hughes Clayton in the 1860s. A township was originally gazetted on Dandenong Road and in 1862 a primary school was opened at the corner of Dandenong Road and Clayton Road, to serve the whole of the Clayton district. This school changed its name to Clayton North Primary School in 1954.

The construction of the railway to Dandenong and Gippsland about 1 km south of Dandenong Road in 1878 prompted the start of a second township where the line crossed Clayton Road.

The Post Office opened on 18 November 1887 as Clayton's Road Railway Station and was renamed Clayton in 1891.

Clayton's rural lands and relative proximity to Melbourne attracted two institutions at the turn of the century: the Talbot Colony for Epileptics on land later occupied by Monash University, and a Women's Convalescent Home. Apart from that, in 1900 the community consisted of farms, three hotels, two churches, a tennis court and a few shops. Market gardens, fruit growing and a municipal abattoir were the leading industries.

The 1960s saw the rapid disappearance of market gardens as urbanisation and industry advanced. At the western edge of Clayton the Oakleigh High School had been opened in 1955 and a second primary school was opened next year at Clayton South. Clayton East Post Office opened in 1958 (and closed 1979).

Melbourne's second metropolitan university, Monash, was opened at Clayton in 1961. Monash is now Australia's largest university. Primary schools at Westall and Clayton West opened in 1961 and 1962, and high schools at Westall and Monash (Clayton North) in 1963 and 1965. In the early sixties Clayton Technical School was opened (Mr Warby inaugural Principal) at the northern end of Browns Rd Clayton, and had pupils attend from wide and far. It had a Science wing and Woodwork and Metalwork workshops, as well as providing studies of the main matric curriculum, however, it was only up to 5th form (year 11). To complete Matric students mainly transferred to the Oakleigh High School for the last year of studies. At its peak attendance would have been over 1000 male pupils. It was closed sometime in the 1980s. The only piece of land left from where the school once stood, is now titled Fregon reserve. In 1971 the Catholic bishops of Victoria and Tasmania purchased land adjacent to Monash University to house their seminary, Corpus Christi College. The seminary was moved to Carlton in 1999, and the site now serves as a conference centre.

Numerous factories, including Volkswagen (later became the Datsun/Nissan plant), Wilke Printing, Robert Bosch GmbH and Repco were opened after the Second World War. Clayton South and Westall are closer to the sandbelt areas, with the Spring Valley Golf Club, The Grange Reserve and Heatherton Park. Sanitary landfill sites occupy former sand quarries.

While the local community was formerly a part of the now defunct City of Oakleigh local council, in 1995 the municipality became the south-western corner for the City of Monash.

Public Library and Clayton Community Centre

A large new building at the corner of Cooke Street and Centre Road was opened in April 2008. It houses the Clayton branch of the  Monash Public Library Service, a swimming pool, gym, counselling services, health and child care services, theatre and meeting rooms.

Science, technology and research

Clayton is one of the largest centres of science, technology and research in Australia. It is located in Melbourne's south-eastern suburbs, which contains the highest density of high technology industries in Victoria.

Some of the science and technology institutions located in Clayton include:
 Monash University
 Monash Medical Centre
 Australian Synchrotron
 Australian Stem Cell Centre
 Monash Science Technology Research and Innovation Precinct
 CSIRO
 Bosch
 Telstra Research Laboratories
 Australian Regenerative Medicine Institute
 Monash University Accident Research Centre
 Monash Centre for Synchrotron Science
 Centre for Human Bioethics
 Melbourne Centre for Nanofabrication
 John Monash Science School

Business

Clayton is also a hub for both local and international businesses, with a long history of local manufacturing.

Some of the current and former manufacturers located in Clayton include:
 GMSV
 Bosch
 PPG
 Unidrive (now demolished)

Schools
 Clayton North Primary School
 St Peter's Primary School
 John Monash Science School
 Monash Tech School

Sport

The suburb is home to Clayton Football Club, currently competing in the Southern Football League and located at Meade Reserve, Haughton Rd, Clayton.  The club was formed in 1908 and after commencing at a ground on the corner of Crawford Rd & Centre Rd, Clarinda, moved to its current ground in 1919.
Clayton District Cricket Club also plays at Meade Reserve, Haughton Rd, Clayton.  The club was founded as 'Clayton Vale Cricket Club' in 1924 with its original ground in Wordsworth Ave, Westall.
The Club moved to Namatjira Park, Springs Rd, Clayton South in 1953 before settling at Meade Reserve in 1977.

The suburb is home to Waverley Wanderers Soccer Club of Football Federation Victoria and also Waverley Oakleigh Panthers of Victoria Rugby League.

The suburb is home to Clayton Bowls Club, located in Springs Rd, Clayton South.

Places of worship
 St. Andrews Presbyterian Church
 Clayton Church of Christ
 All Saints Anglican Church
 St. Peters Catholic Church
 Clayton Christadelphians
 Monash Mosque

See also
 City of Oakleigh – Clayton was previously within this former local government area.
 Clayton railway station

Gallery

References

External links
Australian Places - Clayton

Suburbs of Melbourne
Suburbs of the City of Monash